Joan Biskupic (born ) is an American journalist, author, and lawyer who has covered the United States Supreme Court since 1989.

Early life and education
Biskupic is one of nine siblings born to a Catholic family of Croatian and Irish descent. She received her high school diploma from Benet Academy, a B.A. degree in Journalism from Marquette University, an M.A. degree in English from the University of Oklahoma, and a J.D. degree from Georgetown University Law Center. One of her brothers, Steven M. Biskupic (born 1961), is a former U.S. Attorney for the Eastern District of Wisconsin, now in private practice. Another brother, Vince Biskupic, is a judge on the Outagamie Circuit Court.

Career 
From 1989 to 1992, Biskupic was a legal affairs writer for Congressional Quarterly. She was awarded the 1991 Everett McKinley Dirksen Award for Distinguished Reporting on Congress for her coverage of the Clarence Thomas hearings for Congressional Quarterly. Prior to that, she covered government and politics for the Milwaukee Journal and the Tulsa Tribune.

From 1992 to 2000, she was the Supreme Court reporter for The Washington Post. From 2000 to 2012 she was the Legal Affairs Correspondent for USA Today. Her work was a finalist for the Pulitzer Prize for Explanatory Reporting in 2015. She was Editor in Charge, Legal Affairs for Reuters from 2012 to 2016.  For the 2016–17 academic year, she was a visiting professor at the University of California, Irvine's School of Law. 

As of May 2022, she is a full-time Supreme Court analyst at CNN. She also regularly appears as a commentator on other television and radio programs. She is a regular panelist on Washington Week and has appeared on The Diane Rehm Show, The Today Show, Good Morning America, Nightline, Face the Nation, and Stay Tuned with Preet.

Biskupic has written a number of books on the Supreme Court, including biographies of Supreme Court Justices Sandra Day O'Connor, Antonin Scalia, and Sonia Sotomayor, and Chief Justice John Roberts. She was awarded three residential fellowships at the Woodrow Wilson International Center for Scholars, in 2003, 2004 and 2008, for work on these biographies.

Honors
She has been a member of the District of Columbia bar since 1994. Biskupic received Honorary Doctors of Laws from Georgetown University in May 2014 and Marquette University in May 2010.

Publications

References

External links
 Joan Biskupic's Web site
 Joan Biskupic's blog: Court Beat
 

1950s births
20th-century American non-fiction writers
20th-century American women writers
21st-century American non-fiction writers
21st-century American women writers
American lawyers
American legal writers
American people of Croatian descent
American people of Irish descent
American women journalists
American women lawyers
Date of birth missing (living people)
Georgetown University Law Center alumni
Living people
Marquette University alumni
Supreme Court of the United States people
University of Oklahoma alumni
USA Today journalists
The Washington Post journalists